Sands of the Desert is a 1960 British adventure comedy film directed by John Paddy Carstairs and starring Charlie Drake in his first lead role in a feature film, Peter Arne, Sarah Branch and Raymond Huntley.

Premise
Charlie Sands, a British travel agent is sent to run a holiday camp in the Arabian Peninsula after his predecessor is assassinated because the property is sitting on a potential oilfield.

Cast

Box Office
Kine Weekly called it a "money maker" at the British box office in 1960.

Critical reception
TV Guide described it as "a mildly amusing comedy that never really delivers its laugh quota, due primarily to its uneven script. Drake, a popular British television comic of the day, is good, though the movies are clearly not his metier."

References

External links

1960 films
1960s adventure comedy films
British adventure comedy films
Films about vacationing
Films shot at Associated British Studios
Films directed by John Paddy Carstairs
Films with screenplays by John Paddy Carstairs
Films set in the Arabian Peninsula
Films set in deserts
Films set in London
1960 comedy films
1960s English-language films
1960s British films